Ma. Kristina Edrosa Lee (born circa 1986), better known as Lady Lee, is a former child actress in the Philippines. She was the 1st Runner-Up in the Little Miss Philippines 1990 segment in Eat Bulaga!.

Career
She is the contemporary of Aiza Seguerra in Eat Bulaga's Little Miss Philippines. She was nominated for Best Child Actress FAMAS Award in Kailan Ka Magiging Akin (1991). She appeared in movies like Leon At Tigre (1989) starring Maricel Soriano and Rene Requiestas and The Vizconde Massacre Story (1993) starred Kris Aquino, among others. She's currently working in a BPO Industry with high hopes to build her career on a different form.

Personal life
She has a daughter who wants to join the show business.

Filmography
At Your Service (TV show) - Child Stars Reunited (2005)
Ang Iibigin Ay Ikaw (TV series) (2002-2003)
Kadenang Kristal (TV series) (1995-1996)
Ulong Pugot: Naglalagot (1995)
Tunay Na Magkaibigan, Walang Iwanan... Peksman (1994)
The Vizconde Massacre Story (God Help Us!) (1993) as Jennifer Vizconde
Eat Bulaga! (TV show) (1990-1997)
Shake, Rattle & Roll IV (1992)
Boy Anghel: Utak Pulburon (1992)
Pido Dida 3: May Kambal Na (1992)
The Good, The Bad, & The Ugly (1992)
Luv Ko Si Kris (1991-1992)
Kailan Ka Magiging Akin (1991)
Goosebuster (1991)
Leon At Tigre (1989)
Silang Mga Sisiw Sa Lansangan (1993)

References

External links

Little Miss Philippines 1990: Lady Lee

Living people
Filipino film actresses
Filipino child actresses
1986 births
Filipino television actresses